Arrowhead Library System may refer to:

Arrowhead Library System (Minnesota), a public library system
Arrowhead Library System (Wisconsin), a public library system